Futsal in Australia is governed by the Football Federation Australia and its state based futsal associations. Australia has played in seven FIFA Futsal World Cups.

History
In 1970, the first competitive indoor soccer game was played in Australia at the YMCA Sporting Complex in Epping, Sydney. It was introduced by Edwin (Eddie) Palmer, a new immigrant, who had recently arrived from East Africa.

In 1971, Dawn Gilligan, Jack Bowder and a few parents of the players taking part in the inaugural competition, took a team to Revesby YMCA. It was played due a wet in the winter football season, which closed outdoor grounds for many weeks. Gilligan and then manager of the YMCA, Joe Brent wrote to England to obtain official rules and the game spread to other YMCAs. The following year the game of futsal, which at the time was experiencing worldwide growth, was introduced in the Revesby YMCA, and adapted as a competitive competition for the new season. The popularity of the sport saw it slowly spread to the other states.

In 1977, Brent became first president of the Australian Indoor Soccer Association, which affiliated with FIFUSA two years later. The first national championships took place in Melbourne in 1980.

Competitions
The F-League was the national futsal competition in Australia. It is organised by FNSW.

By state or territory

South Australia

In South Australia, the South Australian Futsal League (SAFL) is the state's premier competition.  It was established in 2013, and is yet to be affiliated with Football South Australia.

In Western Australia the Supa-Liga www.futsalsupaliga.com.au and the WA State Futsal league are the state's premier competitions. The Supa-Liga is organised by www.westcoastfutsal.org.au and they run futsal specifically in multiple locations around WA, and Pro Futsal which affiliates with Football West, and played at the Pro Futsal Centre in Bibra Lake. The two competitions have more than 30 clubs currently competing in the Futsal leagues in Men, Women, Youth and Junior competitions. The West Coast Futsal Association have state and national representative links while also linking players to clubs overseas.

Queensland
Queensland's top division in Futsal is the SEQ Futsal Premier League which is organised by Football Queensland, the states governing Football organisation.

Victoria
In Victoria, the premier Futsal league is known as Series Futsal Victoria organized by Futsal Oz. The Series Futsal lower leagues are known as Series Futsal Championship, State League 1 and State League 2.
In the Eastern part of Victoria, the premier Futsal league is known as Pro Futsal Mt Evelyn Premier League which is organized by Pro Futsal Mt Evelyn, a sub-branch of Pro Futsal. Pro Futsal Mt Evelyn is affiliated with Football Victoria.
In the Western part of Victoria, the premier Futsal league is known as AFG Premium League which is organized by Australia Futsal Group and is affiliated with Football Victoria.

The Australian Futsal Association considers itself to be the biggest futsal organisation in Australia which organised competitive state futsal league and national championship tournaments around Australia.

Futsal OZ
Futsal Oz is an elite futsal organization founded by a former Australian Futsal player Peter Parthimos. Its headquarter is located in Brunswick, Victoria and has organised Semi-Professional Futsal Leagues and Cups tournaments all over of Australia. The first-tier league is the Serie Futsal which comprises six semi-professional futsal leagues in six territories and states. The top clubs of each leagues compete against each other in a three-day elite Futsal tournament called Serie Futsal Australia.

Pro Futsal 

Pro Futsal is a private organization that runs Futsal competitions in Western Australia and Victoria State.  The competitions consists of Elite, Juniors and Social competitions and the headquarter is located in Bibra Lake, Western Australia and has a sub-branch in Mount Evelyn, Victoria. 
Pro Futsal Perth premium competition is known as the WA State League and Pro Futsal Mt Evelyn is known as Mt Evelyn Premier League.

National teams
The national futsal teams represent Australia in international competition. Australian national teams historically competed in the OFC, though since FFA's move in 2006, Australian teams have competed in AFC competitions.

The Australian futsal team represents Australia at the FIFA Futsal World Cup and the AFC Futsal Championship.

The Australian women's futsal team represents Australia at the Women's Futsal World Tournament.

See also

Soccer in Australia

References

External links
Futsal4All - Futsal News for Australia, New Zealand and the Pacific Islands
Australian Futsal Association
Futsal Oz

South Australian Futsal League
Supa-Liga
West Coast Futsal Association
Pro Futsal
WA State Futsal League